The Gateshead and District Tramways operated a tramway service in Gateshead between 1883 and 1951.

History

The Gateshead and District Tramways commenced services on 22 October 1883 with steam-hauled tramcars operating on three routes centred on Gateshead High Street.

In 1897, British Electric Traction took ownership of the company and the Gateshead and District Tramways Act of 1899 authorised the modernisation and electrification of the system.

Electric services started on 8 May 1901.

On 5 February 1916, a runaway tram crushed a family of three and a soldier, home on leave due to injuries received in France, on Bensham Hill. The crashed occurred when the tram's driver, who was aged 20, left his tram to aid his colleagues in a oncoming tram in which a fight was occurring. Whilst the driver was away from his tram, more passengers boarded, causing the tram to roll back and run away. The tram driver was acquitted of manslaughter at Durham Assizes.

On 12 January 1923, through running to the Newcastle Corporation Tramways was possible across the North Eastern Railway's High Level Bridge over the Tyne.

Closure

The last tram operated on 4 August 1951. Several tramcars survived the closure. Nineteen cars were sold to the Grimsby & Immingham Electric Railway. Two of these survived into preservation. No 5 is at the National Tramway Museum and No 10 is at the Beamish Museum.

References

Tram transport in England